Abertillery Excelsiors A.F.C. are a Welsh football club from the town of Abertillery, Blaenau Gwent in South Wales. Formed in 2000 as Tillery FC, they have played in the Welsh Football League. The team play in the Gwent County League Premier Division, tier 4 of the Welsh football pyramid.

History

At the end of the 1999–2000 season, two neighbouring clubs, Cwmtillery and Abertillery Town forged an alliance, and played under the club name Tillery FC until the close of the 2004–05 season. At the beginning of the 2005–06 season, the club was officially renamed Abertillery Excelsiors.

Honours

 Gwent County League Amateur Cup Champions: - 2018-19
 Gwent County League Premier Division Champions: — 2019-20
 Gwent County League Second Division Runners-up: – 2018-19
 Gwent Amateur Cup – Runners-up: 2017–18

Welsh Football League history
Information in this section is courtesy of Football Club History Database and the Welsh Soccer Archive.

Notes

References

External links

Football clubs in Wales
Sport in Monmouthshire
2000 establishments in Wales
Association football clubs established in 2000
Gwent County League clubs
Welsh Football League clubs
Abertillery
Ardal Leagues clubs